is a passenger railway station located in the city of Wakayama, Wakayama Prefecture, Japan, operated by the private railway operator Nankai Electric Railway.As its name ("Front of Wakayama University Station"}) implies, it serves Wakayama University. Its station number is NK43.

Lines

Station layout
The station has two side platforms with an elevated station building above the tracks and platforms.

Platforms

Adjacent stations

History

The name of the new station was publicly announced in September 2010. The station opened on 1 April 2012.

Passenger statistics
In fiscal 2019, the station was used by an average of 9,659 passengers daily (boarding passengers only).

Surrounding area
 Wakayama University Sakaedani Campus
 Fujitodai (New town)
 Noritsu Head Office

See also
 List of railway stations in Japan

References

External links

  

Railway stations in Japan opened in 2012
Railway stations in Wakayama Prefecture
Wakayama (city)